Minnesota Glacier is a broad glacier, about  long and  wide, flowing east through the Ellsworth Mountains in Antarctica, separating the Sentinel Range and the Heritage Range. It is nourished by ice from the plateau west of the mountains and by Nimitz Glacier and Splettstoesser Glacier, and merges into the larger Rutford Ice Stream at the eastern margin of the Ellsworth Mountains.

The glacier was named by the Advisory Committee on Antarctic Names for the University of Minnesota, Twin Cities, which sent research parties to the Ellsworth Mountains in 1961–62, 1962–63 and 1963–64.

Tributary glaciers
 Splettstoesser Glacier
 Gowan Glacier
 Webster Glacier
 Nimitz Glacier
 Wessbecher Glacier
 Hudman Glacier
 Carey Glacier

See also
 List of glaciers in the Antarctic
 Glaciology

References

Glaciers of Ellsworth Land
Ellsworth Mountains